Catephia shisa is a species of moth of the  family Erebidae. It is found in Taiwan.

References

Catephia
Moths described in 1920
Moths of Taiwan